Oxynaspis is a genus of goose barnacles in the order Lepadiformes.

Genera
The following species are listed by the World Register of Marine Species:

 Oxynaspis alatae Totton, 1940
 Oxynaspis auroraensis Chan, Chen & Yu, 2013
 Oxynaspis biradius Chan, Chen & Yu, 2013
 Oxynaspis celata Darwin, 1852
 Oxynaspis connectens Broch, 1931
 Oxynaspis gracilis Totton, 1940
 Oxynaspis indica Annandale, 1910
 Oxynaspis joandianeae Van Syoc & Dekelboum, 2011
 Oxynaspis joankovenae Van Syoc & Dekelboum, 2011
 Oxynaspis pacifica Hiro, 1931
 Oxynaspis perekrestenkoi Van Syoc & Dekelboum, 2011
 Oxynaspis rossi Newman, 1972
 Oxynaspis ryukyuensis Chan & Hayashi, 2012

References

Barnacles
Crustacean genera